Intelegis is a program of the Brazilian State, funded by the Inter-American Development Bank (IADB) and administered by the Federal Senate of Brazil. Its mission is to integrate and modernize the Brazilian Legislative Power, in Municipal, State and Federal levels. It started in 1997 in the Brazilian Senate Data Processing organ - Prodasen, born from the PhD project of Armando Roberto Cerchi Nascimento, an official of that body. In 1999 the Brazilian Government signed the contract, establishing a partnership between the IADB and the Brazilian Senate, initiating the Interlegis Program, which was divided into 3 phases: e-Parliament (technology within the parliament), e-Government (process automation and availability of network services for the citizen) and e-Democracy (citizen participation in the legislative process).

In practice, Interlegis Program seeks to improve communication and information flow among legislators, increase the efficiency and competence of the Legislative Houses and promote citizen participation in the legislative processes, preparing the Brazilian parliaments for Participatory Democracy or e-Democracy. It operates based on four pillars: Communication, Information, Training and Technology.

In the technology area, Interlegis Program develops systems for the parliaments, released them as free and open source software under the GPL license and it are developed with the participation of user communities and concerned citizens, supported by Colab environment. The main systems are:

 SAPL - Legislative Process Support System - aimed at automation of electronic legislative process;
 Model Portal - a CMS portal is ready to use and customized for a Legislative Houses with transparency tools, law on access to information, public participation, open data, e-democracy, among others.
 SAAP - Parliamentary Activity Support System - aimed at automation of offices of parliamentarians;
 SPDO - Protocol Document System - aimed at automating the electronic protocol of the Legislative Houses, reducing paper usage;
 SAAL - Legislative Administration Support System - aimed at administrative automation of a parliament, as a legislative ERP. Is under development and not yet have a useful version.

The Interlegis was responsible for one of the biggest digital inclusion programs at the beginning of the 21st century, distributing equipment and connecting to the Internet 3398 Brazilian municipalities through the Municipal Councils and Legislative Assemblies, thus creating Interlegis National Network - RNI. Today the technology infrastructure sector of Interlegis also active in hosting products and services developed and provided free of charge by Interlegis to the Brazilian Legislative Houses.

In 2010 Interlegis created the Colab, which is a collaborative environment for the legislative communities of practice, which has Internet tools to encourage participation of concerned citizens, officials and parliamentarians of the Legislative Houses, with the goal of solving the practical parliaments problems, allowing better communication between the participating people and collaborate in various areas of knowledge such as legislative counsel, development of technologies, legislative communication and administration, among others.

In 2013, after the administrative reform of the Brazilian Senate, Interlegis Program, which was previously run by a special secretariat called SINTER, became administrated by the Brazilian Legislative Institute - ILB, supervised by the Brazilian Senate body responsible for the training of legislative servants. At that time, the contract with the IADB regarding the 2nd phase (e-Government) has been extended until the end of 2014, when will occur the renegotiation and redefinition of the continuity of the program to start the 3rd phase (e-Democracy).

External links 
 Interlegis Portal
 Colab - Legislative Communities Collaboration Environment
 Download and documentation wiki for Interlegis developed software

References 
 Multiphase Program Supporting Electronic Legislative Development in Brasil (Interlegis II)
 Parliamentary Power Integration
 Support Multi-Phase Program Electronic Legislative Development

Legislatures
Democracy
E-democracy
E-government by country